Lorenzo Nigro (born 1967) is an Italian archaeologist, novelist and water-colorist. He is Full Professor of Near Eastern Archaeology in the Faculty of Letters and Philosophy at Sapienza University of Rome. He directs four main archaelogical expeditions at Jericho in Palestine, with the Ministry of Tourism and Antiquities,  at the Early Bronze Age (3rd millennium BC) fortified city, previously unknown, of Khirbet al-Batrawy in the Hashemite Kingdom of Jordan, and at Motya, a Phoenician city in Western Sicily, and he is co-director of the Institut National du Patrimoine-Sapienza University of Rome Expedition to Carthage. Since 2015 he started the archaeological exploration, again in cooperation with the Palestinian Ministry of Tourism and Antiquities, in the necropolis of Bethlehem (Qalet al-Jam'a, Jebel Daher, Barda'a) and at the site of Tell es-Sheikh Abu Zarad, ancient Tappuah. In all these excavations it has been protagonist of several important discoveries, from the reconstruction of the Bronze Age City at Jericho, to the Temple of the Kothon at Motya, to the entire unknonw city of Batrawy with its magnificent fortifications, the Palace of the Copper Axes (now on exhibit in the National Archaeological Museum in the Cidadel of Amman), and the Broad Room temple. At Motya it has uncovered at least four temples and detailed a prehistoric stratigraphy at the foot of the acropolis showing that the island in Sicily was occupied and known to Mediterranean sailormen since the beginning of the 2nd Millennium BC.

Lorenzo Nigro has written 26 monographs and more than 230 articles on the archaeology of ancient Near East, Phoenicia and Mediterranean Mesopotamian and Egyptian archaeology and history of art, ranging from palatial and temple architecture, pottery chronology, Levantine and Iranian metallurgy, Sumerian and Akkadian art, Phoenician ceramics, settlement studies, history of excavations, etc.

Career

His academic career took place mainly at Sapienza, with some initial experiences carried out in the Pontifical Universities. In fact, he taught archeology and biblical geography at the Pontifical Lateran University (1996-2000) and at the Pontifical Biblical Institute (2000-2006), while from 1998 to 2005 he was head of the Oriental Antiquities Department of the Vatican Museums, directing the Gregorian Egyptian Museum and curating the setting up of the last four rooms of the museum.

From 2000 to 2005 he was a researcher and then an associate professor of Archeology and History of Art of the Ancient Near East, again at Sapienza University, first in the Department of Ancient Sciences and then of Oriental Studies. Since 1 September 2021 he has been Full Professor of the same discipline in the Faculty of Letters and Philosophy of Sapienza. Furthermore, after having succeeded Antonia Ciasca in the chair of Phoenician-Punic Archaeology, he held it until 2020. He has revitalized the Class A scientific journal "Vicino Oriente" since 2000 and is a member of numerous editorial and scientific committees of national and international journals. international.

Since 2013 he has been Director of the Sapienza Museum of the Near East, Egypt and the Mediterranean, of which he oversaw the rearrangement in the new headquarters of the Rectorate Palace (rear side, Sala Piacentiniana), increasing the collections and organizing them, from the inauguration on 19 March 2015, a series of exhibitions and scientific events. In this enterprise Nigro, in addition to making use of the experience of the Vatican Museums, brought together the ideas developed during several stays in Philadelphia at the University of Pennsylvania Museum of Archeology and Anthropology (2015-2016).

He was the protagonist of important archaeological discoveries in the excavations that he has been directing for more than twenty years in Sicily, on the island of Mozia (2002-2023), in Palestine, in the ancient city of Jericho (Tell es-Sultan; 1997-2023), in Bethlehem, Tell Abu Zarad (ancient Tappuah, 2015-16), and in Jordan at Khirbet al-Batrawy (2005-2023), a very ancient city of the 3rd millennium BC. which he discovered in 2004, and at Jamaan and Khirbet al-Jamus (2017-2020), two Iron Age fortresses in the Zarqa region. Since 2019, together with Moez Achour and Mounir Fantar of the Institut National du Patrimonie of Tunisia, he has led the excavations of the Sapienza in Carthage on the Odéon Hill and at the necropolis of Dermech in the area of the Baths of Antoninus (2019-2023).

He has made a significant contribution to the reconstruction of the archeology and history of the Levant in the Bronze and Iron Ages through a great variety, quality and quantity of publications. His studies of Jericho (with the identification of the Canaanite name of the city "Ruha" in the 2nd millennium BC), and Bethlehem have contributed to a profound revision of the history and archeology of these important preclassic centers. His research on the Mediterranean, starting from Mozia, resulted in the great PRIN 2017 project "Peoples of the Middle Sea" conducted by coordinating 60 researchers to reconstruct innovation, integration and change in the formation of Mediterranean cultures between the second and first millennium B.C.

In Motya he identified several archaic structures: the prehistoric layers of the 2nd millennium BC, the Fondaco which was the first Phoenician settlement on the island, which he dated to the beginning of the 8th century BC, the Circular Tèmenos with the Temple of Baal and Astarte, the Western Fortress, the House of the Domestic Sacellum, the House of Triton's Horn, and resumed the excavations of the so-called Temple of Cappiddazzu (probably dedicated to the Phoenician god Melqart/Herakles); he has also excavated the Tofet, the sanctuary for incinerated children (carrying out important analyzes of ancient DNA) and, extensively resuming the exploration of the walls, to which he has dedicated two fundamental studies (Nigro 2019 and 2020). In Tower 6 of the walls of Mozia he discovered the funerary stele of an important figure, Abdi-Melqart, while at the Temple of Astarte of Kothon he found an ancient lithic anchor from the 2nd millennium BC, much older than the Phoenician settlement, as well to three votive deposits of objects that belonged to the temple, including the Protome of Astarte.

In Jordan, the identification in 2004 and the subsequent exploration of the ancient city of Khirbet al-Batrawy led to the discovery of the "Palace of the Copper Axes" in which important finds from the third millennium were preserved in a layer of destruction BC, among which five copper axes (today exhibited in the National Archaeological Museum of the Citadel of Amman) a necklace with 630 pearls and various potter's wheels, as well as various Egyptian finds (a lotus vase, a slate palette, a fragmentary serekh and a pearl of amazonite), which have made it possible to recognize the commercial relations of Batrawy at the time of the Pharaohs of the IV-VI Dynasty.

In 2015-2016 he directed the project of the Italian Cooperation "JOAP=Jericho Oasis Archaeological Park" for the protection and enhancement of 13 archaeological sites in the Jericho Oasis. Since 2022 it has undertaken a new intervention for the enhancement of the Tell es-Sultan site, again supported by AICS and Unesco together with the Ministry of Tourism and Antiquities of Palestine, which aims at the recognition of the site in the World Heritage List of the Unesco.

His passion and field experiences are reflected in the two archaeological novels: Jericho. The Revolution of prehistory and I genî di Mozia, dedicated respectively to the Neolithic Age in the oldest city in the world and to the saga of Giuseppe Whitaker's family and to the mystery of Garibaldi's treasure.

Since 2009, in his capacity as director of the archaeological mission in Mozia della Sapienza he has joined the Scientific Council of the Giuseppe Whitaker Foundation, Palermo, for which he has edited the edition of several volumes and therefore has known the reality of the Villa Malfitano in Palermo, a unique monument which he also worked on.

Since 2017 he has been interested in the reproduction of ancient sculpture works through laser scanning and photogrammetry, creating several replicas of the extraordinary statue of the so-called Young Man of Mozia and of the statue of the Baal of Mozia (now kept in the Antonino Salinas Regional Archaeological Museum in Palermo). In 2022 he made a replica in organic material of the mummy of Pharaoh Ramses II in the Sapienza Museum of the Near East, Egypt and the Mediterranean.

Publications

Articles and Chapters
with Marchetti, "Cultic Activities in the Sacred Area of Ishtar at Ebla during the Old Syrian Period: The Favissae F.5327 and F.5238", Journal of Cuneiform Studies, 1997, 1-44
"The two steles of Sargon: iconology and visual propaganda at the beginning of royal Akkadian relief", Iraq, 1988, 85-102
with Zalloua et al. "Ancient DNA of Phoenician remains indicates discontinuity in the settlement history of Ibiza", Scientific Reports, 2018.
with Calcagnile, Yasin, Gallo, Quarta. "Jericho and the Chronology of Palestine in the Early Bronze Age: A Radiometric Re-Assessment", Radiocarbon, 2019, 211-241
"The Italian-Palestinian Expedition to Tell es-Sultan, Ancient Jericho (1997-2015): Archaeology and Valorisation of Material and Immaterial Heritage" in (eds. Sparks, Finlayson, Wagemakers, Briffa) 'Digging Up Jericho: Past, Present, and Future,' Oxford: Archaeopress, 2020, pp. 175-214
"The sacred pool of Ba'al: a reinterpretation of the ‘Kothon’ at Motya", Classical Archaeology, 2022, pp. 354-371

Books

Tell es-Sultan/Jericho in the Context of the Jordan Valley: Site Management, Conservation and Sustainable Development. 2006.
Tell Es-Sultan/Jericho in the Early Bronze II (3000-2700 BC): The Rise of an Early Palestinian City : a Synthesis of the Results of Four Archaeological Expeditions. 2010.

References

External links
 Official website of Archaeological Expedition to Motya, Sicily
 Official website of Rome "La Sapienza" Expedition to Palestine, in Jericho, Palestine
 Official website of Rome "La Sapienza" Expedition to Jordan, at Khirbet al-Batrawy, Zarqa Governatorate

1967 births
Living people
Italian archaeologists
Academic staff of the Sapienza University of Rome
Ebla
Academic staff of the Pontifical Biblical Institute